Roodekoppies Dam is a concrete gravity type dam located on the Crocodile River near Brits, North West, South Africa. It was established in 1986 and serves mainly for irrigation purposes and domestic and industrial use. The hazard potential of the dam has been ranked high (3).

See also
List of reservoirs and dams in South Africa
List of rivers of South Africa

References 

 List of South African Dams from the Department of Water Affairs and Forestry (South Africa)

Dams in South Africa
Dams completed in 1984